Bon Accord Baths is an indoor swimming pool in Aberdeen, Scotland. It is not currently operational, but is being managed by Bon Accord Heritage, a registered charity working to restore and reopen the facility under community ownership.

History 
Construction on the complex began in 1937, and it was opened on 30 August 1940. The opening of the Baths was recorded in a surviving news film.

The complex was closed between April and November 2006 for refurbishment. It was closed permanently by Aberdeen City Council on 31 March 2008 as part of wider budget cuts. The council stated that the operating costs were much higher than similar facilities across the UK, and that the complex were surplus to its requirements. It was reported to have cost over £1 million per year to operate. In March 2010, the council announced that it was intending to sell the complex, noting that it had the potential for re-development while retaining the architectural features of the building.

In 2015, a closing date was set for offers on the baths. However, the complex was not sold. It is still owned by Aberdeen City Council, but Bon Accord Heritage have an agreement with the Council to develop plans for the restoration and reopening of the Baths under community ownership.

Architecture 
The complex is housed within an Art Deco building. The structural system is reinforced concrete and masonry. The street elevation is faced in granite ashlar. It was Category B listed in 1991. The building was designed by architect Alexander McRobbie of the Aberdeen City Architects Department.

Reopening campaign 
The community group Save Bon Accord Baths (later becoming Bon Accord Heritage SCIO) was established in 2014 with the aim of reopening the complex. In September 2020, the group held an Open Weekend allowing the public to tour the building, with a programme of Open Weekends continuing in 2021 and beyond. Extensive work has been undertaken by the volunteers and trustees to date, including the cleaning up of much of the Baths, remedial work to prevent further decline, removal of all vegetation from the roof, extensive boarding and securing of the building to prevent unauthorised access and further damage.

References

External links 

 Save Bon Accord Baths

Swimming venues in Scotland
Sports venues in Aberdeen
1940 establishments in Scotland
2008 disestablishments in Scotland
Granite buildings
Art Deco architecture in Scotland
Category B listed buildings in Aberdeen